Vathy is a town and a community in the municipal unit of Avlida in the Euboea regional unit, Greece. The Greek National Road 44 (Thebes - Chalcis - Karystos) passes west of the town. The community Vathy consists of the town Vathy and the villages Mikro Vathy, Paralia and Ritsona.

Population

Ritsona 

The village Ritsona, population 535, is 7 km west of Vathy. The name Ritsona is believed to come from resin, referring to the pines that used to be abundant in the area. In recent years due to forest fires, a large part of the area's pine trees have disappeared. Today there are many vineyards.

Its history began during the Homeric period with the ancient Boeotian city of Mykalissos.  The archaeological site was extensively excavated between 1909 and 1922 by Ronald Burrows and Percy and Annie Ure, under the aegis of the American School of Classical Studies at Athens. In May 1944, during World War II, the occupying Germans executed 110 Greek soldiers here that had been wounded in the Greco-Italian War in retaliation for an assault by the Greek resistance. 

The Ritsona Rally is one of the most famous car races in Greece, taking place every year in December since 1956.

Ritsona is the place, where – 13 years after legalization – the first crematorium in Greece was opened at the end of September 2019.

See also
List of settlements in the Euboea regional unit

References

External links
Vathy at the GTP Travel Pages

Populated places in Euboea (regional unit)